Bartošova Lehôtka (1920–1927: ,; ; ,)  is a village and municipality in Žiar nad Hronom District in the Banská Bystrica Region of central Slovakia.

History
In historical records, the village was first mentioned in 1396. Its name in 1487 was Bartoslevka (1534 Barthoslehotha; lehota means village in Slovak). It belonged to the Esztergom Archbishopric and since 1776 to the Banská Bystrica Bishopric.

Municipality
The municipality is headed by Zlatica Groschová, who ran as an independent candidate in 2018 elections, beating Ľubomír Bielik of SNS by a swing of over 5%. Local council is assembled of 5 councillors, all of whom ran as independent candidates.

As of 2021, Bartošova Lehôtka separates 54.5% of its municipal waste.

Genealogical resources

The records for genealogical research are available at the state archive "Statny Archiv in Banska Bystrica, Slovakia"

 Roman Catholic church records (births/marriages/deaths): 1710-1896 (parish B)

See also
 List of municipalities and towns in Slovakia

References

External links
https://web.archive.org/web/20070427022352/http://www.statistics.sk/mosmis/eng/run.html
Surnames of living people in Bartosova Lehotka

Villages and municipalities in Žiar nad Hronom District